|}

This is a list of Legislative Council results for the Victorian 2018 state election.

Results by region

Eastern Metropolitan
The Liberal Party were defending three seats while the Greens and Labor were defending one each.

Eastern Victoria
Labor and the Liberal/National coalition were defending two seats each and the Shooters, Fishers and Farmers were defending one.

Northern Metropolitan
The Labor Party were defending two seats, while the Liberals, Greens and Sex Party (now Reason Party) were defending one each.

Northern Victoria
The Liberal/National coalition and Labor Party were defending two seats each, and Shooters, Fishers and Farmers were defending one seat.

South Eastern Metropolitan
Liberal and Labor were defending two seats each. The Greens were defending one.

Southern Metropolitan
The Liberals were defending three seats, and Labor and the Greens were defending one each.

Western Metropolitan
Labor were defending two seats. Liberals, Greens and Democratic Labour were defending one each.

Western Victoria
Liberals/National coalition and Labor were defending 2 seats each. Vote 1 Local Jobs were defending one seat.

See also 

 2018 Victorian state election
 Candidates of the 2018 Victorian state election
 Members of the Victorian Legislative Council, 2018–2022

References 

2018 Victorian state election
Results of Victorian state elections
Victorian Legislative Council